Anestia is a genus of moth in the subfamily Arctiinae.

Species
 Anestia ombrophanes Meyrick, 1886
 Anestia semiochrea Butler, 1886

References
Natural History Museum Lepidoptera generic names catalog

Lithosiini
Moth genera